Lucas H. Timmins (born December 8, 1982) is an American biomedical engineer and currently an Assistant Professor at the University of Utah. He is active in the fields of computational and experimental biomechanics and the application of these research domains to address prevalent challenges in cardiovascular medicine.

Early life and education
Timmins was born December 8, 1982 in Port Neches, Texas. He attended Port Neches-Groves high school, graduating in May 2001.

Timmins received a Bachelor of Science in Biomedical Engineering from Texas A&M University in 2005. He received a Whitaker International Fellowship in 2007 and performed research in the pathology group at the Blizard Institute, part of the Barts and The London School of Medicine and Dentistry, under the supervision of Stephen E. Greenwald. He obtained a Doctor of Philosophy in 2010, working under James E. Moore Jr., from Texas A&M University. His dissertation research focused on the altered biomechanical environment in the setting of vascular stenting.

Career and research 
After post-doctoral work under the mentorship of Don Giddens at Georgia Institute of Technology and Emory University School of Medicine, Timmins became an Instructor in the Department of Radiology & Imaging Sciences at Emory University School of Medicine in 2015. Since 2016, Timmins has been an Assistant Professor in the Department of Biomedical Engineering and an Affiliate Faculty Member in the Scientific Computing and Imaging Institute at the University of Utah.

The scientific fields he is most actively involved in are biomechanics and interventional cardiology. His research has included work in determining how coronary hemodynamics drive the progression of coronary atherosclerosis1 and also understanding the mechanics dealing with failure of vascular stents.

Timmins was the primary author on a paper that looked at stented artery biomechanics to optimize device design2. This research aimed to validate an algorithm to optimizing stent design to minimize or maximize various blood vessel mechanical properties.

Timmins was a part of a team of researchers that investigated the correlation of plaque area, plaque composition, and vessel remodeling as a function of wall shear stress.

Timmins was a supporting author on a study exploring how device design effects the mechanics of the artery wall. The purpose of this study was to investigate the effects that different stent parameters have on the stresses in the artery wall after implantation and the resulting radial displacement that is achieved by the stent in the interest of preventing failures, such as restenosis or formation of a new blockage.

Selected awards and honors 

 Outstanding Postdoc Award (1 of 4 awarded in School of Medicine), Emory University School of Medicine (2015)
 Young Investigator Award, 8th International Symposium on Biomechanics in Vascular Biology & Cardiovascular Disease, Rotterdam, NL (2013)
 Robert M. Nerem International Travel Award, Parker H. Petit Institute of Bioengineering & Biosciences, Georgia Institute of Technology (2012)
 American Heart Association Postdoctoral Fellowship (Greater Southeast Affiliate) (2011)
 Gandy-Diaz Teaching Fellowship, Wallace H. Coulter Dept. of Biomedical Engineering, Georgia Institute of Technology and Emory University (2011)

External Links 

 Cardiovascular Pathomechanics Laboratory (aka The Timmins Lab)

References 

1982 births
Living people
American biomedical engineers